Andy Ronan (born 19 June 1963) is an Irish long-distance runner. He competed in the men's marathon at the 1992 Summer Olympics.

References

External links
 

1963 births
Living people
Athletes (track and field) at the 1992 Summer Olympics
Irish male long-distance runners
Irish male marathon runners
Olympic athletes of Ireland
Place of birth missing (living people)